The Hemp Museum is the second solo studio album by American rapper B-Legit. It was released on November 26, 1996 through Sick Wid It/Jive Records. Production was handled by Studio Ton, Mike Mosley, Kevin Gardner, Redwine, Femi Ojetunde, Emgee, Tone Capone and B-Legit himself, who also served as executive producer. It features guest appearances from C-Bo, Levitti, Celly Cel, Daryl Hall, E-40, Kurupt, A-1 and Funk Mobb among others.

The album peaked at number 55 on the Billboard 200 and number 15 on the Top R&B/Hip-Hop Albums in the United States.

Along with a single, a music video was released for the song "Check It Out" featuring E-40 and Kurupt. The song "Ghetto Smile" was later used in the 1997 film Dangerous Ground and also was released as a single and a music video to promote the film's soundtrack. The final track, "My Flow of Cash", is a bonus track exclusive to the CD release.

Critical reception

AllMusic's Leo Stanley wrote: "when the thick-tongued rapper cuts "Check It Out" with E-40 and Tha Dogg Pound's Kurupt, he demonstrates his true skills". The Source reviewer stated that the album "may be the lick if you understand the science behind the Sick Wid It sound, or know the Vallejo flavor". Gabriel Alvarez of Vibe found B-Legit's "badass Bay Area baritone is as distinguishable as a Picasso brush stroke".

Track listing

Sample credits
Track 5 contains a portion of the composition "Another One Bites the Dust" written by John Deacon
Track 6 contains a sample of "Learn About It" written by Earl Stevens, Brandt Jones and Mike Mosley and performed by The Click
Track 8 contains a portion of the composition "Sara Smile" written by Hall & Oates
Track 14 contains a portion of the composition "Do Your Thing" written by Isaac Hayes

Personnel

Vocalists
Brandt "B-Legit" Jones – vocals
Gail Lee Brown – vocals (track 1)
Nicole Ladner – vocals (track 1)
Lewis "Levitti" King – vocals (tracks: 2, 14)
Dionne Jackson – vocals (track 3)
Earl "E-40" Stevens – vocals (track 4)
Ricardo "Kurupt" Brown – vocals (track 4)
"Little Bruce" Thurman – vocals (track 5)
Shawn "C-Bo" Thomas – vocals (tracks: 5, 11)
Robert Redwine – vocals (track 5)
Francci Richard – vocals (track 5)
Jnyce – vocals (track 5)
Marcus "Emgee" Gore – vocals (track 6)
Tenina "Suga-T" Stevens – vocals (track 6)
Kevin "Kaveo" Davis – vocals (track 7)
Daryl Hall – vocals (track 8)
Clifton "G-Note" Dickson – vocals (tracks: 9, 15)
DeShawn "Mac Shawn" Dawson – vocals (tracks: 10, 15)
Marcellius "Celly Cel" McCarver – vocals (track 11)
Rodney "Harm" Waller – vocals (track 12)
Big Bone – vocals (track 13)
D-Day – vocals (track 13)
K. "K-1" Morris – vocals (track 15)

Instrumentalists
Marvin "Studio Ton" Whitemon – keyboards & drum programming (tracks: 1, 2, 4, 7, 10, 14), guitar (track 10), horns programming (track 14)
Mike Mosley – keyboards & drum programming (tracks: 3, 11)
Femi Ojetunde – keyboards (track 3), guitar (track 6)
Kevin Gardner – keyboards & drum programming (tracks: 5, 8)
Thaddeus Turner – guitar (tracks: 5, 8)
Emgee – keyboards & drum programming (track 6)
Stan "The Guitar Man" Jones – guitar (track 6)
James 'Flat Top' Jones – guitar (track 11)
Ken "Squirt" Parker – scratches (track 11)
Anthony "Tone Capone" Gilmour – drums and strings programming & keyboards (track 12)
Antoine – guitar (track 12)
B-Legit – keyboards & drum programming (track 13)
Ken "K-Lou" Franklin – drum programming (track 13)
Greg "Funk Daddy" Buren – keyboards & drum programming (track 15)

Production
Studio Ton – producer (tracks: 1, 2, 4, 7, 10)
Mike Mosley – producer (tracks: 3, 11)
Kevin Gardner – producer (tracks: 5, 8)
Redwine – producer (tracks: 5, 8)
Femi Ojetunde – producer (track 6), co-producer (track 3)
Emgee – producer (track 6)
Tone Capone – producer (track 12)
B-Legit – producer (track 13), co-producer (track 8), executive producer
K-Lou – co-producer (track 13)
Funk Daddy – producer (track 15)

Technical
Studio Ton – engineering (tracks: 1, 2, 7, 10), mixing (tracks: 2, 4, 10), recording (track 14)
K-Lou – mixing (tracks: 3, 11, 13, 15), engineering (tracks: 13, 15)
Mike Mosley – recording (tracks: 3, 11)
B-Legit – mixing (tracks: 3, 11), art direction
Kevin Gardner – engineering (tracks: 5, 8)
Samuel Stevens – engineering (tracks: 5, 8)
Stan "The Guitar" Man – mixing & engineering (track 6)
Emgee – mixing & engineering (track 6)
Peter Moshay – mixing & vocal recording (track 8)
Michael Denten – engineering (track 12)
Tone Capone – mixing (track 12)
Tom Coyne – mastering
Khan aka The Guru – art direction, design
Keba Konte – photography
Mike Wasco – photography
Chaz Hayes – management

Charts

References

External links

1996 albums
B-Legit albums
Jive Records albums
Sick Wid It Records albums
Albums produced by Studio Ton